Shabba Ranks and Friends is a compilation album released by Shabba Ranks, the album includes most of Shabba Ranks' most successful hits. The album also features many other reggae artists who feature in the songs on the album.

Track listing

References

Shabba Ranks albums
1999 compilation albums